Banksia densa is a species of column-like shrub that is endemic to Western Australia. It has deeply serrated to pinnatifid leaves, creamy yellow flowers in heads of up to seventy-five, and hairy follicles.

Description
Banksia densa is a shrub, usually with a column-like form that typically grows to a height of  but does not form a lignotuber.

Taxonomy and naming
This species was first formally described in 1870 by George Bentham who gave it the name Dryandra conferta and published the description in Flora Australiensis. The specific epithet (conferta) is from a Latin word meaning "crowded".

In 1996, Alex George described two varieties:

In 2007, Austin Mast and Kevin Thiele transferred all Dryandra species to Banksia. As there was already a species named Banksia conferta, Mast and Thiele changed the specific epithet to "densa".

The changed names of the varieties are as follows and are accepted at the Australian Plant Census:
 Banksia densa var. densa;
 Banksia densa var. parva;

Distribution and habitat
Banksia densa is widespread in inland parts of the south-west of Western Australia, growing in kwongan, woodland and shrubland between Miling, Cadoux the Porongorups, Bodallin and Mount Holland. Variety parva has a more southerly distribution than var. densa.

Ecology
An assessment of the potential impact of climate change on this species found that its range is likely to contract by between 50% and 80% by 2080, depending on the severity of the change.

Conservation status
This banksia is classified as "Priority Two" by the Western Australian Government Department of Parks and Wildlife meaning that it is poorly known and from only one or a few locations.

References

 

densa
Endemic flora of Western Australia
Eudicots of Western Australia
Plants described in 1870
Taxa named by Kevin Thiele